Nangwarry is a town and a locality in the Australian state of South Australia located about  south-east of the state capital of Adelaide and about  north-west of the regional centre of Mount Gambier.

The Town of Nangwarry was proclaimed under the Crown Lands Act 1929 on 17 October 1974. The boundaries for the locality were proclaimed on 13 December 2001 which include the extent of the Town of Nangwarry and which align with the boundaries of the cadastral unit of the Hundred of Nangwarry.  The locality was given the "long established name".

Nangwarry has a petrol station, a general store, bottle shop, post office, timber mill, and a museum. And a football / netball team known as the Nangwarry Saints, who play in the Mid South Eastern Football League.

The 2016 Australian census which was conducted in August 2016 reports that the locality had a population of 520 of which 483 lived in its town centre.

Nangwarry is located within the federal division of Barker, the state electoral district of Mount Gambier and the local government area of the Wattle Range Council.

References

Towns in South Australia
Limestone Coast